Pureair is an unincorporated community located in the town of Bayfield, Bayfield County, Wisconsin, United States.

History
The area was named after the Pureair Sanatorium which treated tuberculosis patients from Bayfield County, Iron County and Ashland County, as well as some veterans of World War I, between the years 1920–1975. The sanatorium has since been demolished.

Notes

Unincorporated communities in Bayfield County, Wisconsin
Unincorporated communities in Wisconsin